McMaster is a surname of Gaelic origin. The McMaster family originated in Scotland before having their land dispossessed by the Macleans. Ever since losing their land the McMaster surname has migrated throughout England, The United States, Canada and Australia. Notable people with the surname include:
Gerald McMaster, Artist, Author and Curator of Siksika Nation
Henry A. McMasters (1848–1872), Medal of Honor holder
Jake McMasters (born 1950), American author a.k.a. David L. Robbins

See also
 McMaster (disambiguation)
 MacMaster (surname)